Charles Edward Stuart (born November 12, 1935) is a Canadian former professional hockey center.

Career 
Stuart played in the Eastern Hockey League for the Johnstown Jets, Charlotte Clippers, Philadelphia Ramblers, Knoxville Knights and Charlotte Checkers. He ranks second in the league's all-time scoring history with 1121 points. He also set a record in the 1962–63 season with 78 goals in 66 games.

References

External links
 

1935 births
Living people
Ice hockey people from Ontario
Sportspeople from St. Catharines
Johnstown Jets (IHL) players
Charlotte Checkers (EHL) players
Philadelphia Ramblers players
Canadian ice hockey centres